Chief Aminatu Abiodun   (1924-2018) was the 13th Iyalode of Ibadan. Often described as the most powerful woman in Ibadan before her death, Abiodun was noted for her influence within the Olubadan-in-Council - the traditional government of the kingdom - and among its market women.

Before assuming the role of Iyalode, she was a businesswoman. Inside Oyo listed her as one of the "biggest five" persons in Oyo State, alongside the Alaafin of Oyo and Lamidi Adedibu, a fellow Ibadan chief.

References 

1924 births
2018 deaths
Yoruba politicians
People from Ibadan
Politicians from Ibadan